Stephen Messer may refer to:
 Stephen Messer (author)
 Stephen Messer (entrepreneur)